Francis Ng Chun-yu (born 21 December 1961) is a Hong Kong actor and director. He is known for his roles in the TVB series Triumph in the Skies and in films such as Young and Dangerous, Once Upon a Time in Triad Society, A Man Called Hero and The Mission.

Early life
Ng was born in Hong Kong to a family with ancestry from Panyu, Guangzhou, Guangdong, China. He is the uncle of footballer, Ng Wai Chiu.

Ng revealed in a stand-up comedy, saying that when he was a child he told his mother that his dream was to get a job that does not need any academic qualification, without a fixed working hours and high pay. Then, his mother asked him to become a beggar. So, he went to Wong Tai Sin, a famous temple in Hong Kong, to observe those beggars there. He realised that becoming beggar is too busy and need to perform manual labour, which does not suit his free and unconstrained attitude. Consequently, he gave up and decided to become a movie star because being a movie star fulfilled all the condition he requested.

During that time, the only way to become a movie star was to get into TVB Training Classes, so Ng signed up. After failing thrice entering the training classes, he eventually gave up. He went for a short period Pabbajja for seven days, shaved his head bald. After the event, he decided to try applying for the training classes again and this time he succeeded. He said in an interview that he succeeded because the interviewer thought that he Knew Shaolin Kung Fu due to his bald head.

Television career
He graduated from TVB's training classes in 1982 along with Stephen Chow and Tony Leung. He acted in minor roles for the first few years in his television career. Until 1985, he started to involve in a great deal of TV Series, he was very outstanding in playing villainous roles in TV series such as The Price of Growing Up and The Final Combat. Later on, he played as a protagonist in situation comedies such as Everybody Loves Somebody and The Family Squad, which make him gradually disengage from being the stereotypical villain.

His contract with TVB ended in 1993 and he broke into the movie industry. In 1997, he returned to TVB to star a nostalgic comedy series Old Time Buddy with Gallen Lo, Maggie Cheung and Jessica Hsuen, which was one of the highest rating TV series that year. Later in 2003, he was invited back to TVB again to film Triumph in the Skies casting an airline pilot. He was the leading man role of the series, that series was cited as one of the best serial drama in TVB. He also involved in the sequel of the series Triumph in the Skies II which was aired on 15 July 2013.

Film career
Ng entered the movie industry in 1986, and debuted in Midnight Girls. As a newcomer, he was only given minor roles. After becoming a freeman in 1993, he had the chance to be involved in bigger production film such as  Flirting Scholar with Stephen Chow and Kung Fu Cult Master with Jet Li.

Ng's turning point in his filming career came in Young and Dangerous (1995), as villain Ugly Kwan, which was so popular that it spun an unofficial spin-off in Once Upon a Time in Triad Society (1996).  His output has steadily increased since then. During 1999, he has won the Golden Horse Awards Best Actor for The Mission and the Hong Kong Film Critics Society Best Actor for Bullets Over Summer. In 2002, he also won the Hong Kong Film Awards and Golden Bauhinia Awards Best Supporting Actor for 2000 AD.

Although Hong Kong cinema encountered a downturn in the late 1990s, however Ng still put on at least 10 films per year. Ng also ventured into the arena of directing. He has directed a few movies including 9413 (1998), What is a Good Teacher (2002), Dancing Lion (2003) and Tracing Shadow (2009).

Along with Lau Ching-wan and Anthony Wong, he was named as one of the major three character actors working in the Hong Kong film industry at the 25th Hong Kong International Film Festival.

Other performances
Other than television series and movies, Ng once was involved in stand-up comedy with Cheung Tat-ming and Dayo Wong in 1998 and 2000.

He provided the voice for Mr. Incredible/Bob Parr in the Cantonese version of Disney and Pixar's The Incredibles.

Others
In the Greater China, the Mexican professional football goalkeeper Guillermo Ochoa is often regarded as a lookalike of Francis Ng, and therefore bears the nickname "Mexican Francis Ng".

Filmography

Television series

Films

Variety show

References

External links 
 Francis Ng at allmovie.com
 Francis Ng Chun-Yu at hkmdb.com
 Francis Ng Chun-Yu at lovehkfilm.com

1961 births
Living people
Cantonese people
Hong Kong Buddhists
Hong Kong male film actors
Hong Kong male television actors
People from Panyu District
TVB actors
20th-century Hong Kong male actors
21st-century Hong Kong male actors
Hong Kong male voice actors